Elmwood Cemetery is a cemetery in Gooding, Idaho.

Notable burials
 Frank R. Gooding (1859–1928) – Governor of Idaho 1905–09, U.S. Senator 1921–28. Namesake of the city and county.
 James Henry Mays (1868–1926) – U.S. Representative from Utah 1915–21.
 John W. Thomas (1874–1945) – U.S. Senator 1928–33 and 1940–45.

References

External links
 

Buildings and structures in Gooding County, Idaho
Cemeteries in Idaho